Roger Federer defeated Gilles Simon in the final, 7–6(8–6), 7–6(7–2) to win the singles tennis title at the 2014 Shanghai Masters. Federer saved five match points en route to his first Shanghai Masters title, against Leonardo Mayer in the second round.

Novak Djokovic was the two-time defending champion, but lost to Federer in the semifinals.

Seeds
The top eight seeds receive a bye into the second round.

Draw

Finals

Top half

Section 1

Section 2

Bottom half

Section 3

Section 4

Qualifying

Seeds

 Teymuraz Gabashvili (qualified)
 Federico Delbonis (first round)
 Andrey Golubev (qualified)
 Bernard Tomic (qualified)
 Marinko Matosevic (first round)
 Malek Jaziri (qualified)
 Sam Groth (qualified)
 Filip Krajinović (qualifying competition)
 Tatsuma Ito (qualifying competition)
 Go Soeda (first round)
 Máximo González (qualifying competition)
 Ričardas Berankis (first round)
 James Ward (qualified)
 Peter Gojowczyk (qualifying competition)

Qualifiers

Qualifying draw

First qualifier

Second qualifier

Third qualifier

Fourth qualifier

Fifth qualifier

Sixth qualifier

Seventh qualifier

References
 Main Draw
 Qualifying Draw

Shanghai Rolex Masters - Singles
Singles